Franco Figueroa (born December 30, 1989) is an Argentinian football player.

Career
Figueroa signed with Carolina RailHawks in May 2014, making his professional debut on June 8, 2014 in a 1-6 loss against FC Edmonton.

References

1989 births
Living people
North Carolina FC players
Association football forwards
North American Soccer League players
Argentine footballers
Footballers from Buenos Aires